SISCOG is a software  company that provides decision support systems for resource planning and management in transportation companies, with special experience in the field of railways.

History

The initial ideas for founding SISCOG started to be discussed in 1982 while João Pavão Martins and Ernesto Morgado were Ph.D. students in artificial intelligence at the State University of New York at Buffalo. These ideas were influenced by the success of the first commercial expert systems, and led to the company's incorporation in 1986.

Through these last 30 years, SISCOG has developed several software products that offer users different levels of decision support. These range from validating all the constraints pertaining to a problem and performing helpful calculations while the users build the plan (manual mode), to pointing out directions for achieving a solution (semi-automatic mode) or even achieving an optimised solution by themselves (automatic mode). These products use a combination of artificial intelligence and operational research optimization technologies to produce solutions that attempt to fit the client needs.

SISCOG has implemented its decision support systems in companies like the Canadian Railways, Dutch Railways, Finnish Railways, Norwegian State Railways, Danish State Railways, DSB S-Tog – Copenhagen Suburban Trains, London Underground and Lisbon Metro.

SISCOG's products have been awarded in 1997, 2003 and 2012 with the "Innovative Application Award" given by the Association for the Advancement of Artificial Intelligence (AAAI) and was laureated with the Computerworld Honor in 2006. In 2015, the Conference on Advanced Systems in Public Transport (CASPT) recognized a SISCOG and Netherlands Railways' joint paper entitled "Security crew scheduling at Netherlands Railways" with the "Best Practice Paper Award".

Software Products

SISCOG offers a family of integrated products, each one composed of several integrated modules. These modules address the whole resource scheduling and management cycle in transportation companies and are fully customisable to the reality and needs of each individual company.

ONTIME, a product that creates detailed timetables, all the way from the annual timetables down to day-to-day adjustments due to special holidays, large-scale events, and track engineering work. ONTIME schedules and manages the allocation of two important resources to the company trips: space (routes, railway lines/tracks, air routes/corridors, etc.) and time (departure and arrival times of all trip legs).

FLEET, a product for vehicle scheduling and management. It creates optimized vehicle schedules, considering expected passenger figures, fleet specifications, and operational constraints. FLEET produces long-term cyclic plans, calendar short-term plans, handles vehicles scheduled maintenance, and provides decision-support during day-to-day operation.

CREWS, a product for scheduling and managing the work of staff. CREWS optimizes the use of both on-board personnel (drivers, guards, conductors, catering staff, etc.) as well as local staff (station, contact center, and railway yard staff, etc.). CREWS produces long-term cyclic schedules (duties and rosters) as well as short-term calendar schedules, taking into account special days of operation and staff's individual schedules and preferences. It maintains several kinds of individual work time accounts, provides individual inspection of work, and provides standard interfaces to payroll and HR management systems.

References

External links
SISCOG Official Website

Software companies of Portugal
Common Lisp (programming language) software